Miary is a town and commune in Madagascar. It belongs to the district of Toliara II, which is a part of Atsimo-Andrefana Region. The population of the commune was estimated to be approximately 6,000 in 2001 commune census.

Primary and junior level secondary education are available in town. Farming and raising livestock provides employment for 40% and 40% of the working population.  The most important crops are cotton and cassava, while other important agricultural products are sugarcane and maize.  Services provide employment for 20% of the population.

Miary lies at the Fiherenana River.

References and notes 

Populated places in Atsimo-Andrefana